In accelerator physics, the Courant–Snyder parameters (frequently referred to as Twiss parameters or CS parameters) are a set of quantities used to describe the distribution of positions and velocities of the particles in a beam. When the positions along a single dimension and velocities (or momenta) along that dimension of every particle in a beam are plotted on a phase space diagram, an ellipse enclosing the particles can be given by the equation:

Three sets of parameters can be calculated for a beam, one for each orthogonal direction, x, y, and z.

History 

The use of these parameters to describe the phase space properties of particle beams was popularized in the accelerator physics community by Ernest Courant and Hartland Snyder in their 1953 paper, "Theory of the Alternating-Gradient Synchrotron". They are also widely referred to in accelerator physics literature as "Twiss parameters" after British astronomer Richard Q. Twiss, although it is unclear how his name became associated with the formulation.

Phase space area description 

When simulating the motion of particles through an accelerator or beam transport line, it is often desirable to describe the overall properties of an ensemble of particles, rather than track the motion of each particle individually.  By Liouville's Theorem it can be shown that the density occupied on a position and momentum phase space plot is constant when the beam is only affected by conservative forces. The area occupied by the beam on this plot is known as the beam emittance, although there are a number of competing definitions for the exact mathematical definition of this property.

Coordinates 

In accelerator physics, coordinate positions are usually defined with respect to an idealized reference particle, which follows the ideal design trajectory for the accelerator.  The direction aligned with this trajectory is designated "z", (sometimes "s") and is also referred to as the longitudinal coordinate.  Two transverse coordinate axes, x and y, are defined perpendicular to the z axis and to each other.

In addition to describing the positions of each particle relative to the reference particle along the x, y, and z axes, it is also necessary to consider the rate of change of each of these values. This is typically given as a rate of change with respect to the longitudinal coordinate (x' = dx/dz) rather than with respect to time. In most cases, x' and y' are both much less than 1, as particles will be moving along the beam path much faster than transverse to it. Given this assumption, it is possible to use the small angle approximation to express x' and y' as angles rather than simple ratios. As such, x' and y' are most commonly expressed in milliradians.

Ellipse equation 

When an ellipse is drawn around the particle distribution in phase space, the equation for the ellipse is given as:

"Area" here is an area in phase space, and has units of length * angle. Some sources define the area as the beam emittance , while others use .  It is also possible to define the area as a specific fraction of the particles in a beam with a 2 dimensional gaussian distribution.

As this ellipse is an instantaneous plot of the positions and velocities of the particles at one point in the accelerator, these values will vary with time. Since there are only two independent variables, x and x', and the emittance is constant, only two of the CS parameters are independent. The relationship between the three parameters is given by:

Derivation for periodic systems 

In addition to treating the CS parameters as an empirical description of a collection of particles in phase space, it is possible to derive them based on the equations of motion of particles in electromagnetic fields.

Equation of motion 

In a strong focusing accelerator, transverse focusing is primarily provided by quadrupole magnets.  The linear equation of motion for transverse motion parallel to an axis of the magnet is:

where  is the focusing coefficient, which has units of length−2, and is only nonzero in a quadrupole field. (Note that x is used throughout this explanation, but y could be equivalently used with a change of sign for k.  The longitudinal coordinate, z, requires a somewhat different derivation.)

Assuming  is periodic, for example, as in a circular accelerator, this is a differential equation with the same form as the Hill differential equation.  The solution to this equation is a pseudo harmonic oscillator:

The amplitude is decomposed into a position dependent part  and an initial value , such that:

(It is important to remember that ' continues to indicated a derivative with respect to position along the direction of travel, not time.)

Particle distributions 

Given these equations of motion, taking the average values for particles in a beam yields:

These can be simplified with the following definitions:

giving:

These are the CS parameters and emittance in another form.  Combined with the relationship between the parameters, this also leads to a definition of emittance for an arbitrary (not necessarily Gaussian) particle distribution:

Properties 

The advantage of describing a particle distribution parametrically using the CS parameters is that the evolution of the overall distribution can be calculated using matrix optics more easily than tracking each individual particle and then combining the locations at multiple points along the accelerator path.

See also 

 Beam emittance
 Beta function (accelerator physics)
 Ray transfer matrix analysis

References 

Accelerator physics